The 1967 Volta a Catalunya was the 47th edition of the Volta a Catalunya cycle race and was held from 6 September to 13 September 1967. The race started in Terrassa and finished in Castelldefels. The race was won by Jacques Anquetil.

General classification

References

1967
Volta
1967 in Spanish road cycling
September 1967 sports events in Europe